Jalan Tengku Mohammad, Federal Route 215 (formerly Terengganu state route T215), is a federal road in Kuala Nerus, Terengganu, Malaysia. The Kilometre Zero of the Federal Route 215 starts at Kampung Gelanggi junctions.

Features
At most sections, the Federal Route 215 was built under the JKR R5 road standard, allowing maximum speed limit of up to 90 km/h.

List of junctions and towns

References

Kuala Nerus District
Malaysian Federal Roads